Samuel McRoberts (April 12, 1799March 27, 1843) was a United States senator from Illinois. Born near Maeystown, he was educated by private tutors and graduated from the law department of Transylvania University in Lexington, Kentucky. He was admitted to the bar in 1821 and commenced practice in Monroe County, and was clerk of the circuit court of Monroe County from 1819 to 1821. He was State circuit judge from 1824 to 1827 and a member of the Illinois State Senate from 1828 to 1830.

McRoberts was appointed United States Attorney by President Andrew Jackson in 1830 and served until 1832, when he resigned he was then appointed by President Martin Van Buren to be receiver of the land office at Danville in 1832. He was appointed Solicitor of the General Land Office at Washington in 1839 and served in that capacity until his resignation in 1841, and was elected as a Democrat to the United States Senate and served from March 4, 1841, until his death; while in the Senate he was chairman of the Committee on Engrossed Bills (Twenty-seventh Congress). He died in Cincinnati, Ohio and was interred in the Moore Cemetery, Waterloo.

See also
List of United States Congress members who died in office (1790–1899)

References

1799 births
1843 deaths
Illinois state court judges
United States Attorneys for the District of Illinois
Democratic Party United States senators from Illinois
Democratic Party Illinois state senators
Transylvania University alumni
Illinois lawyers
People from Monroe County, Illinois
19th-century American politicians
19th-century American judges
19th-century American lawyers